Central Asian Football Association (CAFA) is one of five regional bodies of governance in association football. It governs association football, futsal, and beach football in Central Asia. CAFA consists of six national association members.

CAFA consists of the national football associations of Central Asia, and runs competitions between national teams, and also controls the prize money, regulations, as well as media rights to those competitions. it's currently headquartered in Dushanbe, Tajikistan and through its events, CAFA aims to develop and strengthen the game of football throughout the region by raising the standards and creating more opportunities for the Member Associations for further growth.

In June 2014, the association was in principle approved by the Asian Football Confederation and approved at the Extraordinary Congress in January 2015 during the 2015 AFC Asian Cup. As a result, CAFA will be able to have representative member(s) on the AFC executive committee.

The formation of CAFA was spearheaded by the Iranian Football Federation following disputes with West Asian Football Federation members. It was reported that AFC President Salman Bin Ibrahim Al-Khalifa gained politically from the creation of the new zone.

History
Members of the six nations met with AFC president Sheikh Salman on 10 May 2014 to talk about the possibility of creating a new Asian football zone. The delegations were invited by the AFC president following an initiative and proposed by Afghanistan and Iran. At the extraordinary AFC congress on 9 June 2014 in São Paulo, the plan of the new zone was ratified by the congress.
It was subsequently approved at the AFC Extraordinary Congress in January 2015. CAFA's main headquarters after its foundation is located in Dushanbe, Tajikistan.

Executive committee

Presidents

Vice-presidents

General Secretaries

AFC Vice-Presidents for Central Zone

AFC Executive Committee Members for Central Zone

Member associations
CAFA consists of six member associations. All of them are members of the Asian Football Confederation.

Competitions

Current title holders

CAFA runs several competitions which cover men's, women's, youth and futsal.

Events by Year
Source:

Events Timeline

  Men
  Women

Medals
As of 30 Jan 2023 (After 2023 CAFA Women's Futsal Championship).

Rankings

Men's National Teams
Rankings are calculated by FIFA.

 Last updated as of 24 January 2023.

Leading Men's team:

Women's National Teams

 * Provisionally listed due to not having played more than five matches against officially ranked teams
 ** Inactive for more than 18 months and therefore not ranked
 Last updated 12 September 2022.

Leading Women's team:

Futsal

See also 
 Asian Football Confederation (AFC)
 ASEAN Football Federation (AFF)
 East Asian Football Federation (EAFF)
 South Asian Football Federation (SAFF)
 West Asian Football Federation (WAFF)
 ECO Cup

References

External links
 Official website 

Central Asian Football Association